The Savines Bridge (Pont de Savines) is a 924m concrete viaduct (box girder bridge) in Savines-le-Lac, in the Provence Alps and Prealps of south-east France, built in 1960. It crosses a reservoir of the Durance river.

History

Design
The bridge was designed by Jean Courbon, a famous bridge engineer with the Société d'Études et d'Équipements d'Entreprise, or SEEE of Rue Salvador Allende in Nanterre. It was one of the first post-tensioned prestressed concrete (béton précontraint) bridges built in France.

The concrete piers are 16 foot 5 inches square with 16 inch thick concrete walls.

Construction
It was built by Entreprise GTM, with construction starting in 1958. It was built with the balanced cantilever, or free cantilever, method, and mobile cantilever scaffolding. The reservoir (retenue du barrage) began construction in 1955 and was finished in June 1960.

The bridge was built before the valley had been flooded, and the concrete piers are much higher than they may look.

Structure
It is situated in the Hautes-Alpes department in the Provence-Alpes-Côte d'Azur region in the far east of southern France. It crosses the Lac de Serre-Ponçon, an artificial lake or reservoir. The creation of the lake prompted the 1958 film, Girl and the River. It carries the N94 (Route Nationale RN 94) road.

See also
 International Federation for Structural Concrete (Fédération Internationale du Béton)

References

External links
 Structurae
 History of construction (French)
 1987 documentary

Box girder bridges
Buildings and structures in Hautes-Alpes
Concrete bridges in France
Durance basin
Viaducts in France